Hlengiwe Ntombela (born 12 April 1991), better known as HLE, is a South African gospel singer and songwriter. She is a former member of the gospel choir Joyous Celebration, and currently performs as a solo artist.

Biography

Life 
Ntombela grew up in Newcastle, KwaZulu-Natal, South Africa. Her father was a bishop at Potters House Family Church.

Career 
Ntombela began her career as a backing vocalist for Ntokozo Mbambo. In 2012, she was asked to lead a song with the Joyous Celebrations gospel choir, after Khaya Mthethwa was unable to do so because of a commitment to Idols South Africa. She joined the choir afterwards.

Ntombela later left the choir and embarked on a solo career as HLE. She recorded her debut gospel album, titled Your Kingdom on Earth, in 2019. The same year, she was featured on Benjamin Dube's album, Glory in His Presence.

In 2020, HLE released her debut solo single, "Dwala"; it debuted at number one on the iTunes charts. She launched a project, The HOW Project, which centers around the heart of a worshiper. A month later, she released her second debut single, "You Are". HLE released her debut album, Your Kingdom On Earth (Live).

On July 1, 2020, HLE's weekly show titled "Adlib" premiered on One Gospel, Channel 331, DSTv. In this show, Hle hosts South African gospel musicians.

2022-present: New projects
In February 17, was announced that Hle has signed a record deal with Motown based in Nashville.

Discography 

Singles

 You Are Life (Malak Yaweh, 2018)
 Dwala (Live) (YKOE / The T Effect, 2020)
 You Are (Live) (YKOE / The T Effect, 2020)
 Nguwe (Live) (YKOE / The T Effect, 2020)

Albums

 Your Kingdom On Earth (Live)

Awards

South African Music Awards

|-
|2021
|Herself 
|Best Female Artist of the Year 
|

References

External links 

 
 
 
 HLE on YouTube

Living people
South African gospel singers
People from Newcastle, KwaZulu-Natal
1991 births
Motown artists